This is a list of known transnational marriages between athletes who competed for different countries in the Olympic Games and/or the Paralympic Games. Medal counts before 2022 are also listed. Nationality is defined as the flag under which they competed.

International Olympic couples

Same sex marriages

Other marriages

International Olympic-Paralympic couples

International Paralympic couples

Same sex marriages

Other marriages

References

Lists of spouses
Lists of Olympic competitors
Lists of Paralympic competitors
Married couples
International marriage